Republic of Syria may refer to the following:

Syria, officially the Syrian Arab Republic, the modern-day country controlled by the Ba'athist Party
First Syrian Republic
Second Syrian Republic